Primus Hall (February 29, 1756 – March 22, 1842) was born a slave. He was the son of Prince Hall, an abolitionist, Revolutionary War soldier and founder of the Prince Hall Freemasonry.

In 1798 he established a school for African American children in his home and after the school was moved to the African Meeting House, he raised funds until 1835 for the school. Like his father, he was a recognized leader in the African American community.

Having been given to Ezra Trask as a baby, he was also known as Primus Trask, but within the Boston community known to be the son of Prince Hall.

Early life
Hall was born a slave on February 29, 1756, in Boston. At that time his parents — Prince Hall and a woman named Deliah — were both slaves (though Wikipedia's main entry on Prince Hall contains disputation on whether Prince Hall was ever enslaved, was ever married to a woman named Delia, or fathered Primus; this based on the work of Prince Hall biographer David L Gray). At the time of Hall's birth, his father was enslaved by William Hall; he attained his freedom in 1770.

He was "bound out" to Ezra Trask, an Essex County shoemaker, as a baby or an infant. An arrangement was made to teach Primus to be a shoemaker, and at the age of twenty-one he was set to obtain his freedom. Instead, before that happened, due to diagnosed health issues Hall was given his "freedom with full liberty for me to transact any of all business of every kind." Until 1776 he worked as a truckman and farmer in the Salem, Massachusetts area.

Revolutionary War 

He was a Revolutionary War soldier, having enlisted at the age 19 in the 5th Massachusetts Regiment. His father encouraged enslaved and freed blacks to serve the American colonial military. He believed that if blacks were involved in the founding of the new nation, it would aid in the attainment of freedom for all blacks. Although the colonial army did not initially accept African American soldiers, after the British Army allowed black men to join the army in exchange for their freedom, the Continental Army relented. It is believed, but not certain, that Hall's father was one of the six "Prince Halls" from Massachusetts to serve during the war.

Hall first went with the 5th Massachusetts regiment to Winter Hill, Massachusetts. There, his company "waited out the Siege of Boston." In New York, the regiment fought in the White Plains and Harlem Heights battles. They also fought in Trenton and Princeton, New Jersey. After one year, Hall re-enlisted and fought in Saratoga, New York and was there for the Surrender of General Burgoyne.

Steward to Timothy Pickering

After the war, Hall met Timothy Pickering, who was a Quartermaster General and politician. Hall offered to work for Pickering, who hired him as a steward. He wrote his wife, "I have luckily met with a likely negro fellow who has lived several years in Salem ... He desired to live with me as a Servant ... He said he would not have tendered me his service, but that I was a New England man, & he knew my character." and further that "he was so intelligent to be capable of learning anything." Pickering's wife lived in Newburgh, New York and Pickering was posted in Philadelphia, Pennsylvania. Hall transported supplies and letters between the two locations during the summer of 1781.

Margot Minardi wrote of Hall's proactive offer to work for the Quartermaster General: "Hall's choice to work for Pickering might be best read as a carefully calculated step in this former bondman's upward mobility."

The Godey's Lady's Book published an account of Hall engaging with George Washington during a visit to Pickering. Minardi wrote:

[W]hile in camp, when Washington felt he needed exercises, Hall set up a sort of jump rope for him, fastening one end to a stake and holding the other taut at his own chest. This anecdote gave an amusing picture of the nation's founding father engaged in play 'with true boyish zest.' It revealed little about Primus Hall, other than he seemed to be at General Washington's beck and call.

During another visit, Washington and Pickering had completed their work late in the day. Hall stated that there was an extra blanket and straw for Washington. After both Washington and Pickering had fallen asleep, Hall sat on a box, leaned his head into his hands to sleep. Washington awoke, realized that Hall had given him his bed provisions and insisted that there was sufficient straw and blanket to cover them both. Hall stated that the general need not be concerned, but Washington insisted and the two men shared the straw and blanket that Hall had given up.

Boston

Family and work life
Hall was the father to seven children, having married more than one time. He established himself, independently, as a soapboiler in Boston after working for Pickering.

On May 2, 1786, Primus Trask Hall was married to Phebe Robson by Stephen Lewis at the Christ Church, now commonly known as the Old North Church. They were identified as negros and were married by Rev. Stephen Lewis [who was the minister there at that time]. Phebe died on December 8, 1808 (or December 22, 1808) at 47 years of age of consumption or atrophy.

On January 17, 1810, Primus married Martha Gardner, according to Manifesto Church (Brattle Street Church) records. She died of typhoid fever on January 20, 1817, at 36 years of age.

Primus Hall was married to Anna Clark on October 29, 1817, by Joshua Huntington. Anna was born February 17, 1791, to Peter Clark, who died June 22, 1820.

Hall was an active member of his father's Prince Hall Freemasonry lodge. He was a property owner in Boston.

Education activism

Primus established a school in his home in 1798 for the education of 60 African American children and sought funding from the community, including African American sailors. Elisha Sylvester was a teacher there. After Elisha, two Harvard University students taught the school. Unsuccessful in attempts to establish a public school with the city of Boston in 1800, the school was moved to the African Meeting House, the church built by the Thomas Paul, an African American minister. Hall was one of the founders of the church and he continued fund-raising to support the African American school until 1835.

Besides inspiring Boston's African-Americans to pursue justice and quality in education, the school offered them opportunities for employment and economic growth, which in turn provided funds for future generations of African-American Bostonians to pursue higher education.

Hall advocated for better education for African American children, including access to college educations.

Abolitionism
Primus Hall was active in signing and submitting petitions to the state legislature regarding slavery starting in 1788. He was a supporter of William Lloyd Garrison's abolitionist viewpoints by the 1830s.

Boston Harbor fortification
Hall aided in fortifying Boston Harbor's Castle Island during the War of 1812.

War pension benefit

Pension suit 
In the 1830s, Hall filed a suit for a pension as a Revolutionary War soldier because he had been denied a pension by the pension commissioner. It was assumed that as a colored man, Hall had been a servant and had not participated in battles. In his petition, Hall gave an account of his engagement in New York and New Jersey battles, including when he followed two enemy soldiers for half a mile and took them prisoner. After his second period of enlistment was completed "to the earnest request of George Washington he volunteered for the further term of six weeks." After his service in Princeton and Morristown was completed, George Washington signed his honorable discharge.

White men who had served with him provided testimony that Hall had served as any other soldier, and that he had the respect of officers and other soldiers. The pension commissioner's decision was overruled and Hall received a pension. His suit was filed under the name Prius Hall, alias Trask and was H.R. 318 of 1838. On June 28, 1828, he was approved to receive a pension of $60 per year.

Widow's benefits 
Ann applied for benefits under the Widow's Pension Application file #W.751. Her husband was listed as Primus Trask Hall in the Continental Army, Massachusetts.

Death and obituary
Hall died on March 22, 1842, in Boston. His obituary read that he "was well known, particularly to the younger portions of our citizens, to whom he was in the habit of recounting scenes of the Revolutionary War."

Notes

References

Further reading
 Robert Ewell Greene, Black Defenders of American, 1775-1973 (1974).
 Sidney Kaplan and Emma Nogrady Kaplan, The Black Presence in the Era of the American Revolution (1989).
 Charles H. Wesley, Prince Hall, Life and Legacy (1977).
 Arthur O. White, "The Black Leadership Class and Education in Antebellum Boston," The Journal of Negro Education, 42 (Fall 1973): 506–10.
 George W. Williams, History of the Negro Race in American, 1619-1880 (1968).
 Nell, William C. The Colored Patriots of the American Revolution, 1855.

External links
 Signature of Primus Hall
 Massachusetts History: African American Revolutionary War soldiers

1756 births
1842 deaths
African Americans in the American Revolution
People of Massachusetts in the American Revolution
 
People from colonial Boston
18th-century American slaves
People of colonial Massachusetts
Continental Army soldiers
Abolitionists from Boston